Timos Perlegas (October 22, 1938 in Patras – April 19, 1993 in Maroussi) was a Greek actor. He died from a heart attack.

Early life
In 1955, he moved to Athens and went to acting school. Among his teachers were Manos Katrakis and Giorgos Theodosiadis.

Career
He first appeared on stage as a member of the Karolos Koun theater company in The Persians by Aeschylus. Later on, he toured Europe with The Birds by Aristophanes. He also worked with the National Theatre of Modern Greece for two years as well as the Karezi-Kazakos company. He also appeared in the cinema and on TV.

Perlegas was a member of the Communist Party of Greece since 1975.

Theater 
Some of the plays he appeared in include:
 A Hatful of Rain by Michael V. Gazzo
 Sweet Bird of Youth by Tennessee Williams
 The Visit by Friedrich Dürrenmatt
 The Girl from Maxim's by Georges Feydeau
 The day after the fair by Thomas Hardy

Filmography 
 Ego rezilepsa ton Hitler (1970)
 Mia gynaika stin Antistasi (1970)
 Manto Mavrogenous (1971)
 Lysistrati (1972)
 Thema syneidiseos (1973)
 Kai xana pros ti doxa trava (1980)
 O Thanasis kai to katarameno fidi (1982)
 Tha se klepso, m' akous? (1982) .... as Mr. Karyadis
 O Fonias (1983) .... as Yanis
 To Kolie (1985)
 Ena senario einai i zoi mas (1985) .... as Mitsos Giavroglou
 Paraxeni sinantissi (1986) .... as Mimis
 O Kloios (1987)
 BIOS kai politeia (1987)
 ...kai dyo avga Tourkias (1987) .... as Uncle
 Dexiotera tis dexias (1989)
 Ypoptos politis (1994)

External links 
 

1938 births
1993 deaths
Greek male film actors
Greek male stage actors
20th-century Greek male actors
Actors from Patras